Jay Harris (born February 22, 1965, in Norfolk, Virginia) is an American journalist who has worked for ESPN since February 2003.  Jay currently calls late night his home, seen primarily on the 11pm and midnight eastern editions of SportsCenter, and sometimes on the west coast Sportscenter from Los Angeles.  Jay has hosted a variety of shows during his tenure at ESPN, including Sportscenter, Outside The Lines, NFL Live, Baseball Tonight, Cold Pizza, First Take, Friday Night Fights, and ESPN Sports Saturday on ABC.

Early life
Prior to ESPN, Harris worked for many years at WPGH-TV in Pittsburgh, Pennsylvania, as a weeknight news anchor. He also has local morning radio news experience at WAMO-FM, and national news experience at American Urban Radio Networks, also in Pittsburgh. He also did local radio news at WOWI-FM in Norfolk, Virginia.

Accolades
Harris has several honors including: a Silver World Medal from the New York Festivals, a Robert L. Vann Award from the Pittsburgh Black Media Federation, an EXCEL Award from the Hampton Roads Black Media Professionals. He was also part of two Emmy Award-winning Sportscenter shows. Harris is a 1983 graduate of Chapel Hill High School in Chapel Hill, NC.  A 1987 graduate of Old Dominion University, he received a Distinguished Alumni Award and served as the keynote speaker for its 100th commencement ceremony in 2003, and 2004, respectively.

Personal life
Harris is married to Stephanie Prigmore with 2 children. He is a member of the Nu Theta chapter of Alpha Phi Alpha fraternity.

On the February 22, 2008 episode of SportsCenter, Bill Walton presented Harris with a cake, to the surprise of Harris. Walton also noted that Harris shares the same birth date with famed basketball player Julius Erving.

References

Hewitt, Dr. Clay W. The Glide Journal of Drexel College School of Journalism in Televised Communication Volume 4, July 2007 pp. 113–118

External links
 

He also worked for the San Jose Mercury News and he resigned on March 19, 2001, as he did not want to fire employees after pressures from Knight Ridder group.

Living people
African-American television personalities
African-American sports announcers
African-American sports journalists
American television sports announcers
1965 births
American horse racing announcers
ESPN people
Old Dominion University alumni
Sportspeople from Norfolk, Virginia
Journalists from Virginia
20th-century American journalists
American male journalists
21st-century American journalists